The UAAP Season 81 volleyball tournaments started on October 31, 2018, with the junior tournaments and on February 16, 2019, for the senior tournaments. The games were played at the Filoil Flying V Centre, Mall of Asia Arena, Smart Araneta Coliseum and the Blue Eagle Gym. It is also sub-hosted by Far Eastern University.

Teams
All eight member universities of the UAAP fielded teams in all three divisions.

Coaches

Coaching changes

Men's tournament

Team line-up

Elimination round

Team standings

Match-up results

Game results 
Results on top and to the right of the gray cells are for first-round games; those to the bottom and to the left of it are second-round games.

Playoffs

Semifinals 
NU vs Adamson NU with twice-to-beat advantage.
Elimination round results:
(Mar 3) NU def. Adamson 3–0 • 25–22, 25–18, 25–16
(Mar 20) NU def. Adamson 3–0 • 25–18, 25–18, 25–19

FEU vs Ateneo FEU with twice-to-beat advantage.
Elimination round results:
(Feb 24) FEU def. Ateneo 3–2 • 20–25, 25–22, 25–22, 20–25, 16–14
(Mar 20) Ateneo def. FEU 3–1 • 31–29, 22–25, 25–23, 26–24

Finals 
NU vs FEU Best-of-three series.
Elimination round results:
(Feb 16) FEU def. NU3–0 • 25–12, 25–18, 25–17
(Apr 28) NU def. FEU3–0 • 25–13, 25–23, 25–18

Awards 

 Most Valuable Player (Season): 
 Most Valuable Player (Finals): 
 Rookie of the Year: 
 First Best Outside Spiker: 
 Second Best Outside Spiker: 
 First Best Middle Blocker: 
 Second Best Middle Blocker: 
 Best Opposite Spiker: 
 Best Setter: 
 Best Libero: 
 Best Server:

Women's tournament

Team line-up

Elimination round

Team standings

Match-up results

Game results 
Results on top and to the right of the gray cells are for first-round games; those to the bottom and to the left of it are second-round games.

Playoffs

Second-seed playoff

Semifinals 
Ateneo vs FEU Ateneo with twice-to-beat advantage.
Elimination round results:
(Feb 24) Ateneo def. FEU 3–2 • 14–25, 19–25, 25–21, 25–21, 15–12
(Apr 3) Ateneo def. FEU 3–0 • 25–21, 25–10, 25–18

UST vs La Salle UST with twice-to-beat advantage.
Elimination round results:
(Mar 6) UST def. La Salle 3–0 • 25–20, 25–22, 25–16
(Mar 31) La Salle def. UST 3–1 • 21–25, 25–23, 25–19, 26–24

Finals 
Ateneo vs UST Best-of-three series.
Elimination round results:
(Feb 20) Ateneo def. UST3–1 • 25–21, 25–18, 16–25, 25–22
(Mar 20) Ateneo def. UST3–2 • 19–25, 22–25, 27–25, 25–22, 15–11

Awards 

 Most Valuable Player (Season): 
 Most Valuable Player (Finals): 
 Rookie of the Year: 
 First Best Outside Spiker: 
 Second Best Outside Spiker: 
 First Best Middle Blocker: 
 Second Best Middle Blocker: 
 Best Opposite Spiker: 
 Best Setter: 
 Best Libero: 
 Best Server:

Players of the Week

Boys' tournament
The UAAP Season 81 high school volleyball tournament started on October 13, 2018, at the Blue Eagle Gym. Tournament host for the juniors is the Far Eastern University.

Team line-up

Elimination round

Team standings

Match-up results

Scores

Playoffs

Second-seed playoff

Semifinals 
NU vs Adamson NU with twice-to-beat advantage.
Elimination round results:
(Oct 14) NU def. Adamson 3–0 • 25–14, 25–20, 25–22
(Nov 11) NU def. Adamson 3–2 • 25–12, 22–25, 25–19, 22–25, 15–13

FEU vs UST FEU with twice-to-beat advantage.
Elimination round results:
(Oct 26) FEU def. UST 3–2 • 17–25, 25–27, 25–17, 25–17, 15–11
(Nov 17) UST def. FEU 3–0 • 25–19, 25–17, 25–16

Finals 
NU vs FEU 
Best-of-three series.
Elimination round results:
(Oct 17) NU def. FEU 3–1 • 25–20, 21–25, 25–16, 25–18
(Nov 25) FEU def. NU 3–1 • 21–25, 25–23, 25–22, 25–21

Awards 

 Most Valuable Player (Season): 
 Most Valuable Player (Finals): 
 Rookie of the Year: 
 First Best Outside Spiker: 
 Second Best Outside Spiker: 
 First Best Middle Blocker: 
 Second Best Middle Blocker: 
 Best Opposite Spiker: 
 Best Setter: 
 Best Libero: 
 Best Server:

Girls' tournament

Team line-up

Elimination round

Team standings

Match-up results

Game results

Playoffs

Semifinals 
NU vs Adamson NU with twice-to-beat advantage.
Elimination round results:
(Oct 17) NU def. Adamson 3–2 • 25–16, 22–25, 25–27, 25–12, 15–7
(Nov 11) NU def. Adamson 3–0 • 25–19, 25–18, 31–29

La Salle vs UST La Salle with twice-to-beat advantage.
Elimination round results:
(Oct 23) La Salle def. UST 3–2 • 23–25, 25–11, 23–25, 25–19, 15–11
(Nov 17) La Salle def. UST 3–1 • 25–23, 25–19, 16–25, 27–25

Finals 
NU vs La Salle
Best-of-three series.
Elimination round results:
(Oct 14) NU def. La Salle 3–1 • 25–22, 23–25, 15–25, 22–25
(Nov 21) La Salle def. NU 3–1 • 25–18, 25–12, 18–25, 25–20

Awards 

 Most Valuable Player (Season): 
 Most Valuable Player (Finals): 
 Rookie of the Year: 
 First Best Outside Spiker: 
 Second Best Outside Spiker: 
 First Best Middle Blocker: 
 Second Best Middle Blocker: 
 Best Opposite Spiker: 
 Best Setter: 
 Best Libero: 
 Best Server:

Overall championship points

Seniors' division

Juniors' division 

In case of a tie, the team with the higher position in any tournament is ranked higher. If both are still tied, they are listed by alphabetical order.

How rankings are determined:
 Ranks 5th to 8th determined by elimination round standings.
 Loser of the #1 vs #4 semifinal match-up is ranked 4th
 Loser of the #2 vs #3 semifinal match-up is ranked 3rd
 Loser of the finals is ranked 2nd
 Champion is ranked 1st

See also 
NCAA Season 94 volleyball tournaments

References 

τ
UAAP volleyball tournaments
2019 in Philippine sport